Chris Thome (born January 15, 1969) is a former American football center. He played for the Cleveland Browns from 1991 to 1992.

References

1969 births
Living people
Sportspeople from St. Cloud, Minnesota
Players of American football from Minnesota
American football centers
Minnesota Golden Gophers football players
Cleveland Browns players